Franz Patrick Velasco Garcia, known professionally as Patrick Garcia (born September 14, 1981), is a Filipino actor.

Early life

At the age of 9, Garcia started as an altar boy at St. James Parish Church Headed by Bro. Paul Abiog of Ayala, Alabang where they used to live. He served for several years until his family moved to Frisco del Monte, Quezon City. His parents are Francisco Pablo Pellicer Garcia and Maria Celeste Dahlia Villalobos Velasco.

Career

At the age of 13, his older actress sister Cheska convinced him to try acting. He tried out for the 1994 Philippine movie, Separada, and was cast right away. The movie was well received by the critics and became an instant hit, and also cemented Garcia's status as the newest young heartthrob in the Philippines.

A year later, Garcia landed many more roles in movies and soap operas, such as Gimik, Araw-araw, gabi-gabi, Asero, among others. Then in 1996, he received the Best Child Actor award at the FAMAS Awards, for his role as Ryan in the critically acclaimed Olivia M. Lamasan film, Madrasta. The following year (1997), Garcia received multiple awards in the movie Batang PX.

After Madrasta, Garcia has been working steadily ever since, taking on more challenging character roles in movies, Mano Po III: My Love, Nagbibinata and TV series Captain Barbell and Super Twins.

Garcia was one of the original cast of Ang TV. He was later relaunched as a member of Star Circle (now Star Magic) Batch 2 in ABS-CBN. He is the younger brother of another Ang TV cast and Star Circle Batch 3 member, Cheska Garcia and commercial model Pichon Garcia.

Garcia first began his career in ABS-CBN and then transferred to rival network GMA Network. While he was with ABS-CBN, he was paired with actresses Carol Banawa, Paula Peralejo and Jodi Sta. Maria, the latter (Sta. Maria) of whom he got to work with in more notable projects such as Tabing Ilog (also with Peralejo), Pangako Sa 'Yo, Darating ang Umaga and lastly Kampanerang Kuba. He was also seen on Babangon Ako't Dudurugin Kita and Obra.

In 2009, Garcia starred in the remake of Kung Aagawin Mo ang Lahat sa Akin starring Maxene Magalona and Glaiza de Castro. Then in November 2009, he returned via Full House as Luigi on GMA Network.

After his role in Iglot on GMA Network, Garcia returned to ABS-CBN.

Personal life
Garcia previously dated actress Jennylyn Mercado, together they have a son, Alex Jazz Mercado,
 born on August 16, 2008.  In June 2008, Garcia left for New York "to pursue studies in directing at New York University" but nothing came of his plans to go to film school. He left Jennylyn Mercado, who was at that time, pregnant with their child. On October 9, 2008, Garcia returned to the Philippines for the wedding of his sister Cheska Garcia and basketball player Doug Kramer.

Garcia married Nikka Martinez in March 2015. The couple has one son and three daughters: Michelle Celeste “Chelsea” (born 2012), Nicola Patrice (born 2016), Francisca Pia (born 2017) and Enrique Pablo (born 2021).

Filmography

Television

Film

Awards and nominations
Movie Actor of the Year 14th Star Awards for Movies Batang PX
Best Performer Young Critics Circle Awards Batang PX
Best Actor Nominee FAP Awards Batang PX
 Best Actor Nominee Urian Awards Batang PX
 Teenage Actor of the Year Guillermo Mendoza Memorial Awards
 Best Young Performer Parangal ng Bayan Awards
 German Moreno Youth Achievers Awardee 46th Annual FAMAS Awards
 Favorite Actor of the Year People's Choice Awards Batang PX
 Best Child Actor FAMAS Awards
 Best Supporting Actor Nominee Urian Awards

References

External links
 

1981 births
Living people
21st-century Filipino male actors
Filipino male comedians
Filipino male television actors
Filipino people of Spanish descent
People from Makati
Male actors from Metro Manila
ABS-CBN personalities
Star Magic
GMA Network personalities
Filipino male film actors